Because I Was in Love is the debut album by American singer–songwriter Sharon Van Etten. The album was released May 26, 2009 on Language of Stone. The album received a rating of 7.7 from Pitchfork adding: "Van Etten keeps the album's arrangements minimal and direct, augmenting her voice and guitar with only the occasional splash of organ, brushed cymbals, or multi-tracked vocal harmonies."

Track listing 

All songs written by Sharon Van Etten.

References

2009 albums
Sharon Van Etten albums